Hanover State Opera is an opera company in Hanover, the state capital of Lower Saxony, Germany. The company is resident in the Hanover Opera House, and is part of a publicly-funded umbrella performing arts organisation called Hanover State Theatre of Lower Saxony, or simply Hanover State Theatre.

Hanover State Theatre comprises the following divisions that put on operas, stage productions, and concert programs, in addition to maintaining a theatre museum, with seasons running from September through to June.

Hanover Opera House
Hanover State Opera is resident in the Hanover Opera House, built in classical style between 1845 and 1852 based on a plan by Georg Ludwig Friedrich Laves. The building was rebuilt from 1948 after being badly damaged by the aerial bombings of Hanover during World War II. In 1985, the acoustics were improved, and between 1996 and 1998, the stage facilities were renovated.

The International Choreographic Competition Hannover has taken place at Hanover Opera House since the early  1980s, and is the longest-running choreography competition in the world. It is organised by the Ballet Association of Hanover.

Governance
The current intendant of the opera company is  replacing Michael Klügl in 2019. The current general music director of the opera company is Stephan Zilias, named to the post in February 2020 following his debut with the opera company in the 2019–2020 season.

Past general music directors are:
 Rudolf Krasselt (1924–1943)
 Franz Konwitschny (1945–1949)
 Johannes Schüler (1949–1960)
 Günter Wich (1961–1965)
 George Alexander Albrecht (1965–1993)
 Christof Perick (1993–1996)
 Andreas Delfs (1996–2000)
 Hans Urbanek (2000–2001)
 Lü Shao-chia (2001–2006)
  (2006–2011)
 Karen Kamensek (2011–2016)
  (2016–2019)

The longest-serving general music director of the opera company was George Alexander Albrecht, from 1965 until 1993. The first woman, and first American, to hold the post of general music director was Karen Kamensek, from 2011 until 2014.

Premieres 
 1838: Der Bäbu by Heinrich Marschner (performance took place in the old Schlossopernhaus)
 1852: Austin by Marschner
 1921: Die Prinzessin Girnara by Egon Wellesz
 1931: Prinzessin Brambilla by Walter Braunfels
 1943: Der Kuckuck von Theben by Ermanno Wolf-Ferrari
 1952: Boulevard Solitude by Hans Werner Henze
 1970: Der Aufsichtsrat by Diether de la Motte
 1977: Faust und Yorick by Wolfgang Rihm
 1980: Ein Abenteuer auf dem Friedhof by Alfred Koerppen
 1992: Draußen vor der Tür by Xaver Paul Thoma
 2000: Gilgamesh by Volker David Kirchner
 2005: iOPAL by Hans-Joachim Hespos
 2017: Lot by Giorgio Battistelli

Notable people 

 Marco Goecke

References

External links

 

German opera companies
Tourist attractions in Hanover